The Supreme Council of the Magistracy is an organ of the judicial branch of the Government of Cambodia.

History 
The Supreme Council was established during the 3rd session of the 1st National Assembly of Cambodia on 22 December 1994.

Role 
The main role and function of the council is to guarantee the independence of the judiciary, maintain discipline of judges, and to assure the good functioning of the courts of the Kingdom of Cambodia.

The council also decides and raise its recommendation to the King about the appointments, transfers, disruptions from actual service, suspensions of job, and removals of cadre or title for all judges and prosecutors.

According to Article 2 of the Law on the Organization and Function of the Supreme Council of the Magistracy, the council consists of 9 members:
 King of Cambodia (chairman)
 Minister of Justice 
 Chief of Supreme Court 
 General Prosecutor of Supreme Court 
 Chief of Appeal Court
  General Prosecutor of Appeal Court 
 3 Elected Judges

References

Judiciary of Cambodia